Heartland is the third studio album released by RCA Nashville in 1987 by the American country music duo The Judds. It features the singles "Don't Be Cruel" (a cover of the Elvis Presley song), "Maybe Your Baby's Got The Blues", "Turn It Loose", and "I Know Where I'm Going". The album was released in Europe under the title Give a Little Love and featured six bonus tracks. It reached number 1 on England's country albums chart in 1987, soon after The Judds toured there.

Critical reception

Billboard reviewed the album in the issue dated February 7, 1987. The review said, "With each new outing, the Judds become more vocally adventurous and more eager to assert their delicate mastery over wide-ranging material, new and old. This album–as mournfully country as "The Sweetest Gift" and as airily jazzy as "Cow Cow Boogie"–floats confidently just above grasping tentacles of format. Maher relies almost totally on acoustic backing to trace and emphasize the Judds' vocal beauty; Heartland has all the elements to earn the Judds universal acceptance."

Cashbox published a review of the album in the February 28, 1987 issue which said, "The names under these cuts are a testament in themselves to the star power the mama/daughter duo now possesses: Don Schlitz, Craig Bickhardt, Brent Maher, KT. Oslin, Troy Seals — and on and on. There are some standouts in the crowd nonetheless, including "Turn It Loose", "Old Pictures", and the citified, tongue-in-cheek "Cow Cow Boogie". And, men, you don't need Dr. Ruth–just listen to "Maybe Your Baby’s Got The Blues"."

Thom Jurek of AllMusic rated the album three out of five starts. He felt the album "walks a thin line between roots rock and mainstream country," but criticized it as sounding "a tad uneven...because the great songs...outshine the ballads." He concluded that this "doesn't make [it] a bad or substandard record in any way, just one that creates a tension within itself that remains unresolved."

Track listing

Note: Track 10 is previously unreleased, while tracks 11–15 are taken from the 1984 EP Wynonna & Naomi.

Personnel
The Judds
Naomi Judd – vocals
Wynonna Judd – vocals

Additional Musicians
Bobby Ogdin – organ, piano
Craig Bickhardt, Mark Casstevens – acoustic guitar, electric guitar
Don Potter – acoustic guitar
Sonny Garrish – pedal steel guitar, dobro
Kirk "Jelly Roll" Johnson – harmonica
Craig Nelson – acoustic bass, bass guitar
Jack Williams – bass guitar
David Schnaufer – dulcimer
Eddie Bayers – drums
Farrell Morris – percussion
The Jordanaires – backing vocals on "Don't Be Cruel"
Emmylou Harris – duet vocals on "The Sweetest Gift (A Mother's Smile)

Production
Produced & Mixed by Brent Maher
Engineered by Brent Maher, Joe Funderburk & Jim McKell
Mastered by Glenn Meadows

Charts

Weekly charts

Year-end charts

References

1987 albums
Curb Records albums
The Judds albums
RCA Records albums
Albums produced by Brent Maher